The Columbian mammoth (Mammuthus columbi) is an extinct species of mammoth that inhabited the Americas as far north as the Northern United States and as far south as Costa Rica during the Pleistocene epoch. It was one of the last in a line of mammoth species, beginning with Mammuthus subplanifrons in the early Pliocene. The Columbian mammoth descended from mammoths that colonised North America around 1.5 million years ago, that later hybridised with woolly mammoths during the Middle Pleistocene, prior to 420,000 years ago. The pygmy mammoths of the Channel Islands of California evolved from Columbian mammoths. The closest extant relative of the Columbian and other mammoths is the Asian elephant.

It had long, curved tusks and four molars, which were replaced six times during the lifetime of an individual. It most likely used its tusks and trunk like modern elephants—for manipulating objects, fighting, and foraging. Bones, hair, dung, and stomach contents have been discovered, but no preserved carcasses are known. The Columbian mammoth preferred open areas, such as parkland landscapes, and fed on sedges, grasses, and other plants. It did not live in the Arctic regions of Canada, which were instead inhabited by woolly mammoths. The ranges of the two species may have overlapped, and genetic evidence suggests that they interbred. Several sites contain the skeletons of multiple Columbian mammoths, either because they died in incidents such as a drought, or because these locations were natural traps in which individuals accumulated over time.

For a few thousand years prior to their extinction, Columbian mammoths coexisted in North America with Paleoamericans – the first humans to inhabit the Americas – who hunted them for food, used their bones for making tools, and possibly depicted them in ancient art. Columbian mammoth remains have been found in association with Clovis culture artifacts; these remains may have stemmed either from hunting or scavenging. The Columbian mammoth disappeared at the end of the Pleistocene around 11,500 years ago, most likely as a result of habitat loss caused by climate change, hunting by humans, or a combination of both.

Taxonomy

The Columbian mammoth was first scientifically described in 1857 by naturalist Hugh Falconer, who named the species Elephas columbi after the explorer Christopher Columbus. The animal was brought to Falconer's attention in 1846 by Charles Lyell, who sent him molar fragments found during the 1838 excavation of the Brunswick–Altamaha Canal in Georgia, in the southeastern United States. At the time, similar fossils from across North America were attributed to woolly mammoths (then Elephas primigenius). Falconer found that his specimens were distinct, confirming his conclusion by examining their internal structure and studying additional molars from Mexico. Although scientists William Phipps Blake and Richard Owen believed that E. texianus was more appropriate for the species, Falconer rejected the name; he also suggested that E. imperator and E. jacksoni, two other American elephants described from molars, were based on remains too fragmentary to classify properly. More complete material that may be from the same quarry as Falconer's fragmentary holotype molar (which is cataloged as specimen BMNH 40769 at the British Museum of Natural History) was reported in 2012, and could help shed more light on that specimen, since doubts about its adequacy as a holotype have been raised.

In the early 20th century, the taxonomy of extinct elephants became increasingly complicated. In 1942, paleontologist Henry Fairfield Osborn's posthumous monograph on the Proboscidea was published, wherein he used various generic and subgeneric names that had previously been proposed for extinct elephant species, such as Archidiskodon, Metarchidiskodon, Parelephas, and Mammonteus. Osborn also retained names for many regional and intermediate subspecies or "varieties", and created recombinations such as Parelephas columbi felicis and Archidiskodon imperator maibeni. The taxonomic situation was simplified by various researchers from the 1970s onwards; all species of mammoth were retained in the genus Mammuthus, and many proposed differences between species were instead interpreted as intraspecific variation. In 2003, paleontologist Larry Agenbroad reviewed opinions about North American mammoth taxonomy, and concluded that several species had been declared junior synonyms, and that M. columbi (the Columbian mammoth) and M. exilis (the pygmy mammoth) were the only species of mammoth endemic to the Americas (as other species lived both there and in Eurasia). The idea that species such as M. imperator (the imperial mammoth) and M. jeffersoni (Jefferson's mammoth) were either more primitive or advanced stages in Columbian mammoth evolution was largely dismissed, and they were regarded as synonyms. In spite of these conclusions, Agenbroad cautioned that American mammoth taxonomy is not yet fully resolved.

Evolution

The earliest known members of Proboscidea, the clade that contains the elephants, existed about 55 million years ago around the Tethys Sea area. The closest living relatives of the Proboscidea are the sirenians (dugongs and manatees) and the hyraxes (an order of small, herbivorous mammals). The family Elephantidae existed six million years ago in Africa, and includes the living elephants and the mammoths. Among many now extinct clades, the mastodon (Mammut) is only a distant relative, and part of the distinct family Mammutidae, which diverged 25 million years before the mammoths evolved. The Asian elephant (Elephas maximus) is the closest extant relative of the mammoths. The following cladogram shows the placement of the Columbian mammoth among other proboscideans, based on characteristics of the hyoid bone in the neck:

Since many remains of each species of mammoth are known from several localities, reconstructing the evolutionary history of the genus is possible through morphological studies. Mammoth species can be identified from the number of enamel ridges (or lamellar plates) on their molars; primitive species had few ridges, and the number increased gradually as new species evolved to feed on more abrasive food items. The crowns of the teeth became taller in height and the skulls became taller to accommodate this. At the same time, the skulls became shorter from front to back to reduce the weight of the head. The short, tall skulls of woolly and Columbian mammoths are the culmination of this process.

The first known members of the genus Mammuthus are the African species M. subplanifrons from the Pliocene, and M. africanavus from the Pleistocene. The former is thought to be the ancestor of later forms. Mammoths entered Europe around 3 million years ago. The earliest European mammoth has been named M. rumanus; it spread across Europe and China. Only its molars are known, which show that it had 8–10 enamel ridges. A population evolved 12–14 ridges, splitting off from and replacing the earlier type, becoming M. meridionalis about 2.0–1.7 million years ago. In turn, this species was replaced by the steppe mammoth (M. trogontherii) with 18–20 ridges, which evolved in eastern Asia around 2.0–1.5 million years ago. The Columbian mammoth evolved from a population of M. trogontherii that had crossed the Bering Strait and entered North America about 1.5 million years ago; it retained a similar number of molar ridges. Mammoths derived from M. trogontherii evolved molars with 26 ridges 400,000 years ago in Siberia and became the woolly mammoth (M. primigenius). Woolly mammoths entered North America about 100,000 years ago.

They are, therefore, considered to be the distinct species M. exilis, the pygmy mammoth (or a subspecies, M. c. exilis). These mammoths presumably reached the islands by swimming there when sea levels were lower, and decreased in size due to the limited food provided by the islands' small areas. Bones of larger specimens have also been found on the islands, but  whether these were stages in the dwarfing process, or later arrivals of Columbian mammoths is unknown.

Hybridization

A 2011 ancient DNA study of the complete mitochondrial genome (inherited through the female line) showed that two examined Columbian mammoths, including the morphologically typical "Huntington mammoth", were grouped within a subclade of woolly mammoths. This suggests that the two populations interbred and produced fertile offspring. One possible explanation is introgression of a haplogroup from woolly to Columbian mammoths, or vice versa. A similar situation has been documented in modern species of African elephant (Loxodonta), the African bush elephant (L. africana) and the African forest elephant (L. cyclotis). The authors of the study also suggest that the North American type formerly referred to as M. jeffersonii may have been a hybrid between the two species, as it is apparently morphologically intermediate. These findings were unexpected, and other researchers requested further study to clarify the situation.

A 2015 study of mammoth molars confirmed that M. columbi evolved from Eurasian M. trogontherii, not M. meridionalis as had been suggested earlier, and noted that M. columbi and M. trogontherii were so similar in morphology that their classification as separate species may be questionable. The study also suggested that the animals in the range where M. columbi and M. primigenius overlapped formed a metapopulation of hybrids with varying morphology. In 2016, a genetic study of North American mammoth specimens confirmed that the mitochondrial diversity of M. columbi was nested within that of M. primigenius and suggested that both species interbred extensively, were both descended from M. trogontherii, and concluded that morphological differences between fossils may, therefore, not be reliable for determining taxonomy. The authors also questioned whether M. columbi and M. primigenius should be considered "good species", considering that they were able to interbreed after supposedly being separated for a million years, but cautioned that more specimens need to be sampled.

In 2021, DNA older than a million years was sequenced for the first time, from two steppe mammoth-like teeth of Early Pleistocene age found in eastern Siberia. One tooth from Adyocha (1-1.3 million years old) belonged to a lineage that was ancestral to later woolly mammoths, whereas the other from Krestovka (1.1–1.65 million years old) belonged to new lineage, possibly a distinct species. The study found that  half of the ancestry of Columbian mammoths came from the Krestovka lineage, which were probably representative of the first mammoths to have colonised North America, and the other half from woolly mammoths, with the hybridization happening more than 420,000 years ago, during the Middle Pleistocene. Later woolly and Columbian mammoths also interbred occasionally, and mammoth species perhaps hybridized routinely when brought together by glacial expansion. These findings were the first evidence of hybrid speciation from ancient DNA. The study also found that genetic adaptations to cold environments, such as hair growth and fat deposits, were already present in the steppe mammoth lineage, and was not unique to woolly mammoths.

Description

Males were generally larger and more robust. The best indication of sex is the size of the pelvic girdle, since the opening that functions as the birth canal is always wider in females than in males. Like other mammoths, the Columbian mammoth had a high, single-domed head and a sloping back with a high shoulder hump; this shape resulted from the spinous processes (protrusions) of the back vertebrae decreasing in length from front to rear. Juveniles, though, had convex backs like Asian elephants. Other skeletal features include a short, deep rostrum (front part of the jaws), a rounded mandibular symphysis (where the two halves of the lower jaw connected) and the coronoid process of the mandible (upper protrusion of the jaw bone) extending above the molar surfaces.

 
Apart from its larger size and more primitive molars, the Columbian mammoth also differed from the woolly mammoth by its more downturned mandibular symphysis; the dental alveoli (tooth sockets) of the tusks were directed more laterally away from the midline. Its tail was intermediate in length between that of modern elephants and the woolly mammoth. Since no Columbian mammoth soft tissue has been found, much less is known about its appearance than that of the woolly mammoth. It lived in warmer habitats than the woolly mammoth, and probably lacked many of the adaptations seen in that species. Hair thought to be that of the Columbian mammoth has been discovered in Bechan Cave in Utah, where mammoth dung has also been found. Some of this hair is coarse, and identical to that known to belong to woolly mammoths; however, since this location is so far south, it is unlikely to be woolly mammoth hair. The distribution and density of fur on the living animal is unknown, but it was probably less dense than that of the woolly mammoth due to the warmer habitat. An additional tuft of Columbian mammoth hair is known from near Castroville in California, the hair was noted to be red-orange and was described as being similar in colour to a Golden Retriever.

Dentition

Columbian mammoths had very long tusks (modified incisor teeth), which were more curved than those of modern elephants. Columbian mammoth tusks were usually not much larger than those of woolly mammoths, which reached . The tusks of females were much smaller and thinner. About a quarter of the tusks' length was inside the sockets; they grew spirally in opposite directions from the base, curving until the tips pointed towards each other, and sometimes crossed. Most of their weight would have been close to the skull, with less torque than straight tusks would have generated. The tusks were usually asymmetrical, with considerable variation; some tusks curved down, instead of outwards, or were shorter due to breakage. Columbian mammoth tusks were generally less twisted than those of woolly mammoths. At six months of age, calves developed milk tusks a few centimeters long, which were replaced by permanent tusks a year later. Annual tusk growth of  continued throughout life, slowing as the animal reached adulthood.

Columbian mammoths had four functional molar teeth at a time, two in the upper jaw and two in the lower. The crowns of the lower jaw were pushed forward and up as they wore down, comparable to a conveyor belt. The teeth had separated ridges of enamel, which were covered in "prisms" directed towards the chewing surface. Wear-resistant, they were held together with cementum and dentin. A mammoth's molars were replaced five times over the animal's lifetime. With each replacement, the molars grew larger and gained more ridges; the number of plates varied between individuals. Growing  of ridge took about 10.6 years.

Paleobiology

Like that of modern elephants, the mammoth's sensitive, muscular trunk was a limb-like organ with many functions. It was used for manipulating objects and social interaction. Although healthy adult mammoths could defend themselves from predators with their tusks, trunks, and size, juveniles and weakened adults were vulnerable to pack hunters such as wolves and big cats. Bones of juvenile Columbian mammoths, accumulated by Homotherium (the scimitar-toothed cat), have been found in Friesenhahn Cave in Texas. Tusks may have been used in intraspecies fighting for territory or mates and for display, to attract females and intimidate rivals. Two Columbian mammoths that died in Nebraska with tusks interlocked provide evidence of fighting behavior. The mammoths could use their tusks as weapons by thrusting, swiping, or crashing them down, and used them in pushing contests by interlocking them, which sometimes resulted in breakage. The tusks' curvature made them unsuitable for stabbing.

The study of tusk rings may aid further study of mammoth migration. On Goat Rock Beach in Sonoma Coast State Park, blueschist and chert outcrops (nicknamed "Mammoth Rocks") show evidence of having been rubbed by Columbian mammoths or mastodons. Similar rocks exist in Hueco Tanks, Texas, and on Cornudas Mountain in New Mexico.

Social behavior

Like modern elephants, Columbian mammoths were probably social and lived in matriarchal (female-led) family groups; most of their other social behavior was also similar to that of modern elephants. This is supported by fossil assemblages such as the Dent site in Colorado and the Waco Mammoth National Monument in Waco, Texas, where groups consisting entirely of female and juvenile Columbian mammoths have been found (implying female-led family groups). The latter assemblage includes 22 skeletons, with 15 individuals representing a herd of females and juveniles that died in a single event. The herd was originally proposed to have been killed by a flash flood, and the arrangement of some of the skeletons suggests that the females may have formed a defensive ring around the juveniles. In 2016, the herd was suggested to have died by drought near a diminishing watering hole; scavenging traces on the bones contradict rapid burial, and the absence of calves and the large diversity of other animal species found gathered at the site support this scenario. Another group, consisting of a bull and six females, was found at the same site; although both groups died between 64,000 and 73,000 years ago, whether they died in the same event is unknown. At the Murray Springs Clovis Site in Arizona, where several Columbian mammoth skeletons have been excavated, a trackway similar to that left by modern elephants leads to one of the skeletons. The mammoth may have made the trackway before it died, or another individual may have approached the dead or dying animal—similar to the way modern elephants guard dead relatives for several days.

Accumulations of modern elephant remains have been called "elephants' graveyards", because these sites were erroneously thought to be where old elephants went to die. Similar accumulations of mammoth bones have been found;  these are thought to be the result of individuals dying near or in rivers over thousands of years and their bones being accumulated by the water (such as in the Aucilla River in Florida), or animals dying after becoming mired in mud. Some accumulations are thought to be the remains of herds that died at the same time, perhaps due to flooding. Columbian mammoths are occasionally preserved in volcanic deposits such as those in Tocuila, Texcoco, Mexico, where a volcanic lahar mudflow covered at least seven individuals 12,500 years ago. How many mammoths lived at one location at a time is unknown, but the number likely varied by season and lifecycle. Modern elephants can form large herds, sometimes consisting of multiple family groups, and these herds can include thousands of animals migrating together. Mammoths may have formed large herds more often than modern elephants, since animals living in open areas are more likely to do this than those in forested areas.

Natural traps

Many specimens also accumulated in natural traps, such as sinkholes and tar pits. The Mammoth Site in Hot Springs, South Dakota, is a 26,000-year-old, roughly -long sinkhole that functioned for 300 to 700 years before filling with sediment. The site is the opposite scenario of that in Waco; all but one of the at least 55 skeletons—additional skeletons are excavated each year—are male, and accumulated over time rather than in a single event. Like modern male elephants, male mammoths primarily are assumed to have lived alone, to be more adventurous (especially young males), and to be more likely to encounter dangerous situations than the females. The mammoths may have been lured to the hole by warm water or vegetation near the edges, slipping in and drowning or starving. Isotope studies of growth rings have shown that most of the mammoths died during spring and summer, which may have correlated with vegetation near the sinkhole. One individual, nicknamed "Murray", lies on its side, and probably died in this pose while struggling to get free. Deep footprints of mammoths attempting to free themselves from the sinkhole's mud can be seen in vertically excavated sections of the site.
 
Since the early 20th century, excavations at the La Brea Tar Pits in Los Angeles have yielded  of fossils from 600 species of flora and fauna, including several Columbian mammoths. Many of the fossils are the remains of animals that became stuck in asphalt puddles that seeped to the surface of the pits, 40,000 to 11,500 years ago. Dust and leaves likely concealed the liquid asphalt, which then trapped unwary animals. Mired animals died from hunger or exhaustion; their corpses attracted predators, which sometimes became stuck, themselves. The fossil record of the tar pits is dominated by the remains of predators, such as large canids and felids. Fossils of different animals are found stuck together when they are excavated from the pits. The tar pits do not preserve soft tissue, and a 2014 study concluded that asphalt may degrade the DNA of animals mired in it after an attempt was made to extract DNA from a Columbian mammoth.

A site in at airport construction area in Mexico nicknamed "mammoth central" is believed to have been the boggy shores of an ancient lake bed where animals were trapped 10,0000 to 20,000 years ago. Human tools have been found at the site. It remains unclear whether the 200 Columbian mammoths found there died of natural causes and were then carved by humans. Some have hypothesized that humans drove the Columbian mammoths into the area to kill them. The site is only  from artificial pits which were once used by humans to trap and kill large mammals.

Diet

Mammoths chewed their food using their powerful jaw muscles to move the mandible forward and close the mouth, then backward while opening; the sharp enamel ridges thereby cut across each other, grinding the food. The ridges were wear-resistant, enabling the animal to chew large quantities of food that contained grit. The trunk could be used for pulling up large tufts of grass, picking buds and flowers, or tearing leaves and branches from trees and shrubs, and the tusks were used to dig up plants and strip bark from trees. Digging is indicated on preserved tusks by flat, polished sections of the surface that would have reached the ground. Isotope studies of Columbian mammoths from Mexico and the United States have shown that their diet varied by location, consisting of a mix of C3 (most plants) and C4 plants (such as grasses), and they were not restricted to grazing or browsing.

Stomach contents from Columbian mammoths are rare, since no carcasses have been found, but plant remains were discovered between the pelvis and ribs of the "Huntington mammoth" when it was excavated in Utah. Microscopy showed that these chewed remains consisted of sedges, grasses, fir twigs and needles, oak, and maple. A large amount of mammoth dung has been found in two caves in Utah. The dry conditions and stable temperature of Bechan Cave (bechan is Navajo for "large faeces") has preserved 16,000- to 13,500-year-old elephant dung, most likely from Columbian mammoths. The dung consists of 95% grasses and sedges, and varies from 0 to 25% woody plants between dung boluses, including saltbush, sagebrush, water birch, and blue spruce. This is similar to the diet documented for the woolly mammoth, although browsing seems to have been more important for the Columbian mammoth.

Giant North American fruits of plants such as the Osage-orange, Kentucky coffeetree, pawpaw and honey locust have been proposed to have evolved in tandem with now-extinct American megafauna such as mammoths and other proboscideans, since no extant endemic herbivores are able to ingest these fruits and disperse their seeds. Introduced cattle and horses have since taken over this ecological role.

Life history

The lifespan of the Columbian mammoth is thought to have been about 80 years. The lifespan of a mammal is related to its size; Columbian mammoths are larger than modern elephants, which have a lifespan of about 60 years. The age of a mammoth can be roughly determined by counting the growth rings of its tusks when viewed in cross section. However, ring-counting does not account for a mammoth's early years; early growth is represented in tusk tips, which are usually worn away. In the remainder of the tusk, each major line represents a year, with weekly and daily lines found in between. Dark bands correspond to summer, making determining the season in which a mammoth died possible. Tusk growth slowed when foraging became more difficult, such as during illness or when a male mammoth was banished from the herd (male elephants live with their herds until about the age of 10).

Mammoths continued growing during adulthood, as do other elephants. Males grew until age 40, and females until age 25. Mammoths may have had gestation periods of 21–22 months, like those of modern elephants. Columbian mammoths had six sets of molars in the course of a lifetime. At 6–12 months, the second set of molars would erupt, with the first set worn out at 18 months of age. The third set of molars lasted for 10 years, and this process was repeated until the sixth set emerged at 30 years of age. When the last set of molars wore out, the animal would be unable to chew, and would die of starvation.

Almost all vertebrae of the "Huntington mammoth", a very aged specimen, were deformed by arthritic disease, and four of its lumbar vertebrae were fused; some bones also indicate bacterial infection, such as osteomyelitis. The condition of the bones suggests the specimen died of old age and malnutrition.

Distribution and habitat

Columbian mammoths inhabited the southern half of North America, ranging from the northern United States across Mexico as far south as Costa Rica. One Costa Rican specimen, a molar, was reported in 1963, but has since been lost. The environment in these areas may have had more varied habitats than those inhabited by woolly mammoths in the north (the mammoth steppe). Some areas were covered by grasses, herbaceous plants, trees, and shrubs; their composition varied from region to region, and included grassland, savanna, and aspen parkland habitats. Wooded areas also occurred; although mammoths would not have preferred forests, clearings in them could provide the animals with grasses and herbs.

The Columbian mammoth shared its habitat with other now-extinct Pleistocene mammals such as Glyptotherium, Smilodon, ground sloths, Camelops, mastodons, horses, and bison. It did not live in Arctic Canada or Alaska, which was inhabited by woolly mammoths. Fossils of woolly and Columbian mammoths have been found in the same place in a few areas of North America where their ranges overlapped, including the Hot Springs Site. Whether the two species were sympatric and lived there simultaneously, or if the woolly mammoths entered southern areas when Columbian mammoth populations were absent is unknown. The Columbian mammoth coexisted with the other extinct proboscideans Stegomastodon mirificus and Cuvieronius tropicus at sites in Texas and New Mexico during the early Irvingtonian.

Relationship with humans

Humans entered the Americas through the Beringia landbridge, and evidence documents their interactions with Columbian mammoths. Tools made from Columbian mammoth remains have been discovered in several North American sites. At Tocuila, Mexico, mammoth bones were quarried 13,000 years ago to produce lithic flakes and cores. At the Lange-Ferguson Site in South Dakota, the remains of two mammoths were found with two 12,800-year-old cleaver choppers made from a mammoth shoulder blade; the choppers had been used to butcher the mammoths. At the same site, a flake knife made from a long mammoth bone was also found wedged against mammoth vertebrae. At Murray Springs, archeologists discovered a 13,100-year-old object made from a mammoth femur; the object is thought to be a shaft wrench, a tool for straightening wood and bone to make spear-shafts (the Inuit use similar tools).

The earliest suggested evidence of Columbian mammoth butchering in America (from Lovewell, Kansas) dates from 18,000 to 21,000 years ago. Paleoamericans of the Clovis culture, which arose roughly 7,000 years later, may have been the first humans to hunt mammoths extensively. These people are thought to have hunted Columbian mammoths with Clovis pointed spears which were thrown or thrust. Although Clovis points have been found with Columbian mammoth remains at several sites, archeologists disagree about whether the finds represent hunting, scavenging dead mammoths, or are coincidental. A female mammoth at the Naco-Mammoth Kill Site in Arizona, found with eight Clovis points near its skull, shoulder blade, ribs, and other bones, is considered the most convincing evidence for hunting. In modern experiments, replica spears have been able to penetrate the rib cages of African elephants with reuse causing little damage to the points.

Other sites show more circumstantial evidence of mammoth hunting, such as piled bones bearing butcher marks. Some of these sites are not closely associated with Clovis points. The Dent site (the first evidence of mammoth hunting in North America, discovered in 1932) and the Lehner Mammoth-Kill Site, where multiple juvenile and adult mammoths have been found with butcher marks and in association with Clovis points, were once interpreted as the killing of entire herds by Clovis hunters. However, isotope studies have shown that the accumulations represent individual deaths at different seasons of the year, so are not herds killed in single incidents. Many other such assemblages of bones with butcher marks may also represent accumulations over time, so are ambiguous as evidence for large-scale hunting.

A 2021 article by the American paleontologist Metin I. Eren and colleagues suggested mammoths were not very susceptible to Clovis point weapons due to their thick skin, hair, muscles, ribs, and fat, which would have impeded most types of attacks humans could pull off at that time. Experiments wherein most spear points used to calculate their effectiveness against simulated mammoth skin shattered on impact rather than penetrating, suggested to these researchers that ancient humans probably preferred to scavenge mammoth carcasses for their meat and other resources and threw spears to drive other scavengers away from carcasses before butchering the corpse with their stone tools. While the study does not rule out the hunting of mammoths by early humans, it instead indicates that such an event was probably rare and potentially more dangerous and less rewarding than scavenging. In response, other scientists found no reason to abandon the traditional idea that Clovis points were used to hunt big-game, one suggesting that such spears could have been thrown or thrust at areas of the torso that were not protected by ribs, with the wounds not killing the mammoths instantly, but the hunters could follow their prey until it had bled to death.

Petroglyphs in the Colorado Plateau have been interpreted as depictions of either Columbian mammoths or mastodons. A bone fragment from Vero Beach, Florida, estimated to be 13,000-years old and possibly the earliest known example of art in the Americas, is engraved with either a mammoth or a mastodon. While the authenticity of this depiction is based on continuity of mineralisation across the markings, other possible indicators are inconclusive at present. Petroglyphs from the San Juan River in Utah have been suggested to be 11,000–13,000-years old and to include depictions of two Columbian mammoths; the mammoths' domed heads distinguish them from mastodons. They are also shown with two "fingers" on their trunks, a feature known from European depictions of mammoths. The tusks are short, which may indicate they are meant to be females. A carving of a bison (possibly the extinct Bison antiquus) is superimposed on one of the mammoth carvings and may be a later addition. Geological dating of the San Juan River depictions in 2013 have shown them to be less than 4000 years old, after mammoths and mastodons went extinct, and they may instead be an arrangement of unrelated elements. Other possible depictions of Columbian mammoths have been shown to be either misinterpretations or fraudulent.

The Columbian mammoth is the state fossil of Washington and South Carolina. Nebraska's state fossil is "Archie", a Columbian mammoth specimen found in the state in 1922. "Archie" is currently on display at Elephant Hall in Lincoln, Nebraska, and is the largest mounted mammoth specimen in the United States.

Extinction

Columbian and woolly mammoths both disappeared during the late Pleistocene and early Holocene, alongside most of the Pleistocene megafauna. The most recent Columbian mammoth remains have been dated around 10,900 years ago. This extinction formed part of the Quaternary extinction event, which began 40,000 years ago and peaked between 14,000 and 11,500 years ago. Scientists do not know whether these extinctions happened abruptly or were drawn out.

Scientists are divided over whether climate change, hunting, or a combination of the two, drove the extinction of the Columbian mammoths. According to the climate-change hypothesis, warmer weather led to the shrinking of suitable habitat for Columbian mammoths, which turned from parkland to forest, grassland, and semidesert, with less diverse vegetation. The "overkill hypothesis" attributes the extinction to hunting by humans, an idea first proposed by geoscientist Paul S. Martin in 1967; more recent research on this subject has varied in conclusions.

A 2002 study concluded that the archeological record did not support the "overkill hypothesis", given that only 14 Clovis sites (12 with mammoth remains and two with mastodon remains) out of 76 examined provided strong evidence of hunting. In contrast, a 2007 study found that the Clovis record indicated the highest frequency of prehistoric exploitation of proboscideans for subsistence in the world, and supported the "overkill hypothesis". A 2019 study that used mathematical modelling to simulate correlations between migrations of humans and Columbian mammoths also supported the "overkill hypothesis". Whatever the actual cause of extinction, large mammals are generally more susceptible to hunting pressure than smaller ones due to their smaller population size and low reproduction rates. On the other hand, large mammals are generally less vulnerable to climatic stresses since they have greater fat deposits at their disposal and can migrate long distances to escape food shortages.

References

External links

 
 
 Mammoth Mystery – Nova documentary about the fighting mammoths of Nebraska
 Footage showing removal of a Columbian mammoth skull at the Hot Springs Mammoth Site

Mammoths
Pleistocene proboscideans
Mammoth Columbian
Holocene extinctions
Mammoth Columbian
Fossil taxa described in 1857
Taxa named by Hugh Falconer
Pleistocene mammals of North America